The 2013–14 season was the 131st season in Bristol Rovers' history and their 87th in the Football League. For the third season in a row, Rovers competed in the basement division of the Football League, League Two, having finished 14th in the 2012–13 season.

During the season, Rovers played their first competitive fixture against Newport County since their reformation and their first against Portsmouth in 20 years. They also competed in the first competitive Bristol derby since 2007, losing to Bristol City in the first round of the Football League Trophy at Ashton Gate Stadium.

The season ultimately finished in disappointment as Rovers were relegated out of the Football League for the first time since their admission in 1920. Despite Rovers only ever occupying one of the two relegation places following the final game of the season, the threat of relegation surrounded the club for the entire season.

Season events

Pre-season

April
  – Defender Michael Smith signed a new two-year deal with Rovers.
  – Striker Matt Harrold agreed a new one-year deal at Rovers with the option of a further year extension.
  – John Ward agreed to a new one year rolling contract. Eurocams were announced as new home shirt sponsors and Highspec Travel Services as new away shirt sponsors. Second-year scholars Josh Southway and Pat Keary signed one-year contracts while first-year scholar Jamie Lucas signed a two-year contract.
  – Alefe Santos signed his first professional deal with Rovers.
  – Jim Paterson signed a one-year contract extension having triggered a clause in his previous contract.
  – It was confirmed that winger Joe Anyinsah would be released upon completion of his contract.
  – Defender Mark McChrystal agreed a two-year contract with Rovers.

May
  – Rovers retained list confirmed that Scott Bevan, Adam Virgo, Ross Staley and Oumare Tounkara would leave the club on completion of their contracts. A number of players were offered contract extensions.
  – Tom Lockyer agreed a two-year contract with Rovers, his first professional contract.
  – Midfielder Ollie Clarke signed a one-year contract extension.
  – Goalkeeper Steve Mildenhall agreed a two-year deal with Rovers with an option of a third year. Mildenhall had spent time on loan with Rovers during the previous season.

June
  – Midfielders Fabian Broghammer and Jordan Goddard agreed new one-year contracts.
  – Winger Ellis Harrison agreed a three-year contract with Rovers.
  – Salisbury City manager Darrell Clarke was appointed as Rovers' new Assistant Manager, taking on the role vacated since Shaun North left the club in April. Seanan Clucas agreed a one-year contract extension.
  – Oliver Norburn signed a one-year contract extension.

July
  – John-Joe O'Toole re-joined Rovers on a permanent three-year contract for an undisclosed fee from Colchester United. O'Toole played a major part in Rovers' upturn in form the previous season.

August
  – For the second season in succession, Rovers are knocked out of the League Cup first round by Championship opposition, losing 3–1 at home to Watford.
  – Danny Woodards signed a new one-year deal with Rovers.

September
  – The first Bristol derby in over six years ends in defeat for Rovers, losing 2–1 to local rivals Bristol City in the Football League Trophy First Round. The match, which was broadcast live on Sky Sports, was overshadowed by a post match pitch invasion by a number of supporters, leading to more than 60 arrests being made and three police officers injured.
  – Rovers captain Tom Parkes agreed a one-year contract extension to keep him at the club until 2016.
  – Midfielder Andy Bond joined on a one-month loan deal from Colchester United.

October
  – Rovers sign defender Will Packwood and winger Alex Henshall on one-month loans from Birmingham City and Manchester City respectively.
  – Midfielder and former captain Matthew Gill joined former club Exeter City on loan until the end of 2013.
  – Former youth team Goalkeeper Matt Macey joined Arsenal. Though Macey was out of contract at Rovers, the club will receive a compensation fee believed to be around £100,000.
  – Striker Chris Beardsley joined on a one-month loan deal from Preston North End.

November
  – Jordan Goddard joined Gloucester City on loan for one month.
  – Will Packwood's loan from Birmingham City was extended by two further months.
  – Striker Chris Beardsley agreed a loan extension with Rovers, keeping him at the club until 5 January.

December
  – Defender Will Packwood was recalled by parent club Birmingham City.
  – Garry Kenneth's contract with Rovers was terminated by mutual consent.
  – Rovers' FA Cup second round replay with Crawley Town is abandoned after 75 minutes.
  – It was announced that midfielder and former club captain Matthew Gill's contract would be terminated to allow him to join Exeter City permanently.

January
  – Forward Chris Beardsley's loan from Preston North End was extended to the end of the season.
  – Defender Jim Paterson joined Celtic Nation on loan until the end of the season.
  – Rovers are eliminated from the FA Cup by Championship side Birmingham City in the third round.
  – Shaquille Hunter's agent confirmed that the winger's contract with Rovers was terminated just before Christmas following a series of disciplinary issues. Port Vale winger Kaid Mohamed joined Rovers on loan until the end of the season.

February
  – Steven Gillespie signed for Rovers until the end of the season, having been released from his Fleetwood Town contract in January.
  – Exeter City midfielder Alan Gow joined Rovers on loan for the remainder of the season with Rovers forward Eliot Richards moving in the opposite direction.

March
  – Tom Lockyer signed a contract extension, keeping him at Rovers until the summer of 2016.
  – Ollie Clarke agreed a contract extension at Rovers, committing to the club until 2016.
  – John Ward was replaced as manager by assistant Darrell Clarke. Ward became the club's new Director of Football.

April
  – Midfielder Oliver Norburn left Rovers by mutual consent.
  – Michael Smith and John-Joe O'Toole were selected in the 2013–14 PFA Team of the Year for League Two.

May
  – Rovers' final game of the season ended in a 1–0 defeat to Mansfield Town. Coupled with wins for Northampton Town and Wycombe Wanderers, the result meant that Rovers were relegated to the Conference Premier.
  – Rovers' retained list confirmed that 12 players, Fabian Broghammer, David Clarkson, Seanan Clucas, Steven Gillespie, Jordan Goddard, Conor Gough, Mitch Harding, Pat Keary, Jim Paterson, Eliot Richards, Josh Southway and Danny Woodards, were to be released on completion of their contracts. Ellis Harrison was placed on the transfer list. Lee Brown and Alefe Santos were offered new contracts and Michael Smith was offered a contract extension.
  – John Ward was sacked as the club's Director of Football, just 41 days after taking up the role.

First team
As of 3 May 2014.

Transfers

In

Out

Squad statistics

Appearances, goals and cards

Goal scorers

Penalties

Disciplinary record

Note: Both Tom Lockyer and Oliver Norburn were booked in the abandoned FA Cup match vs Crawley Town. Despite the match not being completed, their yellow cards still stand.

Suspensions served

Note: Tom Lockyer's fifth yellow card came in the abandoned FA Cup match with Crawley Town. Despite the match not being completed, his yellow card and therefore suspension, still stand.

Competitions

Overall

League Two

League table

Results summary

Results by round

Scores Overview
Bristol Rovers score given first.

Matches

Pre-season friendlies

League Two

August

September

October

November

December

January

February

March

April

May

League Cup

Football League Trophy

FA Cup

See also
2013–14 in English football
2013–14 Football League Two
List of Bristol Rovers F.C. seasons

References

External links
 Bristol Rovers F.C.
 Bristol Post
 BBC Sport
 Sky Sports
 Soccerbase: ResultsStatsTransfers

Bristol Rovers F.C. seasons
Bristol Rovers